A Stranger in Paradise is a 2013 thriller film directed by Corrado Boccia and starring Colin Egglesfield, Catalina Sandino Moreno, Stuart Townsend and Byron Mann.

Plot 
As written in the article by Movies News Week, the main character of Josh Pratt, played by (Colin Egglesfield), is on the verge of becoming a partner at a multibillion-dollar hedge fund, but then his life is turned upside down when the Securities and Exchange Commission investigates the head of the fund  for insider trading. Pratt finds himself forced into a “vacation” he never asked for; he ends up in Bangkok with a price on his head, a morally ambiguous brother who is deeply involved with the Thai mafia, and a propensity for getting shot at.

Unfortunately for Pratt, the only way out is to give up information he doesn’t know he has.

Cast
 Colin Egglesfield as Josh Pratt
 Catalina Sandino Moreno as Jules
 Byron Mann as Lek
 Stuart Townsend as Paul Pratt
 Gary Daniels as Derek, Paul's bodyguard
 Sonia Couling-Vacharasinthu as Chris
James Wearing Smith (James With) as Zane
 Teerapat Sajakul as Police Captain
 Sompob Benjathikul as Virote
Jay Acovone as The Interrogator
Ronnie Reid as Agent Harry
Varintorn Yaroojjanont as Somchai
Wittaya Chaiseriwongsawang as Ray
Lynette Emond as Oh
Elina Loukas as Elena
 Jan Yousagoon as Mei
 Sakuntara Peakjuturat as Captain's Assistant
 Paul-Dominique Vacharasinthu as Butler

Production
A Stranger in Paradise was entirely filmed in Thailand with the film's official poster featuring a team of credited producers, emanating from Thailand and abroad; local production services were managed by Benetone Films, and the company website states the firm was an executive producer and a line producer for the film. Production companies collaborating on the film include 24/7 Films, Benetone Films, Hillin Entertainment, Tribus P Films (ex Marengo Films); Noalternative Films is cited as a distribution company in an alternative video with additional footage not shown in the official trailer.

Floods in Bangkok
It is stated that the production was Benetone's first investment into a Hollywood style of film-making and despite expressed nervousness from the producers, the production continued filming during heavy flooding impacting Bangkok, which occurred throughout October and November 2011, and in the same article Marengo Films is also quoted as an executive producer.

Release
The film had its world premiere on February 14, 2014.

Reception
Critical reception for A Stranger in Paradise has been predominantly negative. The Los Angeles Times and The Dissolve both panned the movie; the Los Angeles Times wrote "Besides the pedestrian caricatures of gangsters and strippers, Boccia doesn't make much of the inherent mystery and alienation of the Thai setting as Nicolas Winding Refn did with "Only God Forgives." Even the twists late in the plot underwhelm."

Awards
A Stranger in Paradise appears to have been recognised with an Honorable Award For Contribution to Thailand's International Film Industry in the Thailand International Film Destination Festival 2019 website.

References

External links

2013 films
2013 thriller films
American thriller films
2010s English-language films
2010s American films